The 2021 Queen's Club Championships (also known as the cinch Championships for sponsorship reasons) was a tennis tournament played on outdoor grass courts at the Queen's Club in London, United Kingdom from 14 to 20 June 2021. It was the 118th edition of the event and part of the ATP Tour 500 series of the 2021 ATP Tour.

Finals

Singles

  Matteo Berrettini defeated  Cameron Norrie, 6–4, 6–7(5–7), 6–3

Doubles

  Pierre-Hugues Herbert /  Nicolas Mahut defeated  Reilly Opelka /  John Peers, 6–4, 7–5.

Wheelchair singles

  Gordon Reid defeated  Gustavo Fernández, 6–2, 6–2

Wheelchair doubles
  Joachim Gérard /  Stefan Olsson defeated  Tom Egberink /  Gustavo Fernández, 1–6, 7–6(7–4), [10–6]

Points and prize money

Points distribution

Prize money 

*per team

ATP singles main-draw entrants

Seeds

1 Rankings are as of May 24, 2021.

Other entrants
The following players received wildcards into the main draw:
  Liam Broady 
  Jack Draper
  Andy Murray

The following player received entry using a protected ranking:
  Lu Yen-hsun

The following players received entry from the qualifying draw:
  Illya Marchenko
  Sebastian Ofner
  Viktor Troicki
  Aleksandar Vukic

The following player received entry as a lucky loser:
  Alejandro Tabilo

Withdrawals
Before the tournament
  Alejandro Davidovich Fokina → replaced by  Jérémy Chardy
  Milos Raonic → replaced by  Frances Tiafoe
  Filip Krajinović → replaced by  Alejandro Tabilo
  Diego Schwartzman → replaced by  Alexei Popyrin
  Stan Wawrinka → replaced by  Feliciano López

ATP doubles main-draw entrants

Seeds

1 Rankings are as of May 31, 2021.

Other entrants
The following pairs received wildcards into the doubles main draw:
  Liam Broady /  Ryan Peniston
  Alastair Gray /  Harri Heliövaara
  Stuart Parker /  James Ward

The following pair received entry as an alternate:
  John Millman /  Artem Sitak

Withdrawals
Before the tournament
  Marcelo Arévalo /  Matwé Middelkoop → replaced by  Matwé Middelkoop /  John-Patrick Smith
  Alexander Bublik /  Taylor Fritz → replaced by  Alexander Bublik /  Nicholas Monroe
  Alejandro Davidovich Fokina /  Albert Ramos Viñolas → replaced by  Aljaž Bedene /  Albert Ramos Viñolas
  Grigor Dimitrov /  Feliciano López → replaced by  Feliciano López /  Jannik Sinner
  Laslo Đere /  Filip Krajinović → replaced by  John Millman /  Artem Sitak
  Henri Kontinen /  Édouard Roger-Vasselin → replaced by  Luke Bambridge /  Dominic Inglot

References

External links
 Official website
 ATP Tour website

 
2021 ATP Tour
2021 sports events in London
2021 in English tennis
June 2021 sports events in the United Kingdom
2021